Clyde Rimple (born 16 June 1937) was born in the town of Marabella in Trinidad and Tobago. After passing age 20, he became a leading bicyclist, winning many races, and qualifying for cycling at the 1960 Summer Olympics, although he did not place in those Games.  After his Olympic competition, he rode in the Commonwealth Games.

References

1937 births
Living people
Cyclists at the 1960 Summer Olympics
Olympic cyclists of the British West Indies
Trinidad and Tobago male cyclists